Stoak is a small village and civil parish in the unitary authority of Cheshire West and Chester; and the ceremonial county of Cheshire, England.

Within the parish, to the west of the village is the intersection of the M53 and M56 Motorways, and to its east the Shropshire Union Canal.

The population of the parish as taken at the 2011 census was 171.
The name of the parish was changed from the previous Stoke after a review of town and parish councils in the Cheshire West and Chester unitary authority. The parish should not be confused with a different Cheshire parish called Stoke, in Cheshire East.

The parish church in the village, St Lawrence's Church, is a Grade II* listed building.

See also

Listed buildings in Stoak

References

Villages in Cheshire
Civil parishes in Cheshire
Cheshire West and Chester